The Dance/Electronic Songs chart has been published weekly by Billboard since January 2013. It is the first chart to be published that ranks the most popular dance and electronic songs according to audience impressions, digital downloads, streaming and club play and it was introduced as a result of in an increase in the genre's popularity.

The first number-one song on the Dance/Electronic Songs chart for the issue dated January 26, 2013, was "Scream & Shout" by will.i.am and Britney Spears.
As of the issue dated March 18, 2023, "I'm Good (Blue)" by David Guetta and Bebe Rexha is the current number one.

Background and eligibility criteria
As a result of the increase in the popularity of dance and electronic music, Billboard introduced the Dance/Electronic Songs chart in January 2013 to rank the most popular dance and electronic song according to airplay audience impressions, digital downloads, streaming and club play and publishes it on a weekly basis. They are tracked by Nielsen SoundScan, Nielsen BDS, BDS from streaming services including Spotify and Xbox Music, and from a United States-wide select panel of 140 DJs; it uses the same methodology as is used for the all-genre Billboard Hot 100. It is separate to the Dance Club Songs and Dance/Electronic Digital Songs charts, the former of which is ranked by most popular club play and the latter by the most sales. Songs will be eligible to chart on the Dance/Electronic Songs chart based on their "core sound and tempo," however dance remixes of songs which were originally pop, R&B, rap or a different genre are not eligible for inclusion, regardless of whether it appears on either the Dance Club Songs or Dance/Mix Show Airplay charts.

Song achievements

Most weeks at number one

Artist achievements

Artists with most number-one songs

Artists with most weeks at number-one on the chart 

 82 – The Chainsmokers
 81 – Marshmello 
 69 – Bastille
 55 – Zedd
 37 – Elton John
 36 – Dua Lipa, Pnau, David Guetta, Bebe Rexha
 35 – DJ Snake 
 33 – Maren Morris, Grey
 27 – Avicii, Halsey
 25 – Major Lazer, MØ, Coldplay
 23 – Saint Jhn, Imanbek 
 19 – Travis Scott, Hvme
 17 – Selena Gomez, Surf Mesa, Emile
 16 – Pharrell Williams

Milestones 
Rihanna holds the record for the most songs (6) simultaneously in the top 10, with "We Found Love", "Only Girl (In the World)", "Don't Stop the Music", "Where Have You Been", "S&M" and "Disturbia" during the week of February 25, 2023.
David Guetta holds the record for having the most charted songs, with 74.
DJ Snake holds the milestone as the first artist to have a song positioned at No. 1 on the Year End chart two years straight with "Turn Down for What" featuring Lil Jon in 2014 and "Lean On" with Major Lazer featuring MØ in 2015. The Chainsmokers later replicated this with "Don't Let Me Down" featuring Daya and "Something Just Like This" with Coldplay topping the Year End chart in 2016 and 2017 respectively.
"Latch" by Disclosure featuring Sam Smith holds the record for longest climb to number one, reaching the top in its 47th week on the chart.
"Happier" by Marshmello and Bastille holds the record for most weeks spent on the chart at 92 weeks. It also is the first song to top the chart for a complete year (2019).
"Stupid Love" by Lady Gaga became the first song to debut at number one on the chart during the week of March 14, 2020.
 Lady Gaga's album Chromatica became the first album to have 5 songs in the top 10 for the week of June 13, 2020.
 "Pepas" by Farruko became the first Spanish-language song to reach number one on the chart for the week of August 21, 2021.

See also
List of number-one Billboard Dance/Electronic Songs

References

External links
 Current Dance/Electronic Songs

Billboard charts